Gerard Overdijkink (14 March 1936 – 6 November 2010) was a Dutch field hockey player. He competed in the men's tournament at the 1960 Summer Olympics.

References

External links
 

1936 births
2010 deaths
Dutch male field hockey players
Olympic field hockey players of the Netherlands
Field hockey players at the 1960 Summer Olympics
People from De Bilt
Sportspeople from Utrecht (province)
20th-century Dutch people